Boulder Amplifiers is a private corporation founded in Boulder, Colorado in 1983 by Jeff Nelson as a manufacturer of high-end, solid state professional audio electronics.

The early, primary technology used to distinguish Boulder from other audio manufacturers was the use of the 990 discrete gain stage, based on the original work of Deane Jensen.

In subsequent years, Boulder Amplifiers have shifted their focus from studio electronics to high-end audio electronics utilizing an updated third- and fourth-generation variant of the 990 gain stage and are primarily known for creating products with no limits on retail price, extremely complex engineering, and chassis design which doubles as industrial art.

References

Reviews
Fremer, Michael. Boulder 2008 phono preamplifier & 2010 preamplifier in Stereophile, July, 2002 
Fritz, Jeff. Boulder Amplifiers 1060 Stereo Amplifier and 1010 Preamplifier in Soundstage!, January, 2005

External links
Boulder Amplifiers

Audio amplifier manufacturers
Compact Disc player manufacturers
Audio equipment manufacturers of the United States
Manufacturing companies based in Colorado

sv:Boulder